Vasilievichy is a city in Gomel Region, Belarus.

History
Within the Grand Duchy of Lithuania, Vasilievichy was part of Minsk Voivodeship. In 1793, the town was acquired by the Russian Empire in the course of the Second Partition of Poland.
 
During World War II, Vasilievichy was occupied by the German Army from 25 August 1941 until 18 November 1943.

Climate 
Vasilievichy has a humid continental climate (Köppen Dfb) with warm to hot summers, with cold winters, albeit still mild for being so far inland at such a high latitude.

Notable people 
 Yury Zacharanka – Belarusian minister of internal affairs and oppositional politician abducted and probably killed in 1999

References

Cities in Belarus
Populated places in Gomel Region
Rechytsa District
Minsk Voivodeship
Rechitsky Uyezd